This article displays the squads for the 1938 World Men's Handball Championship. Each team consisted of 10 to 15 players.

Appearances, goals and ages as of tournament start, 16 January 2009.

Teams

Head coach:  Wilhelm Tolar, Tour guide:  Hans Zelinka

Players

Head coach:  Aksel Pedersen

Players

Head coach:  Otto Kaundinya

Players

Head coach:  Herbert Johansson

Players

References

World Mens Handball Championship Squads, 1938
1938 squads